The Kingdom of Amber, also known as Kingdom of Dhoondar and Jaipur State, was located in the Rajputana region of India and was ruled by the Kachhwaha clan. It was established by Dulha Rai, possibly the last ruler of the Kachchhapaghata dynasty of Gwalior who migrated to Dausa and started his kingdom there with the support of Chahamanas of Shakambhari in the 11th century. Mostly through 12th to 15th century, the kingdom faced stagnation sources are scarce. Under Chandrasen, it became a Sisodia vassal and fought in the Battle of Khanwa under Prithviraj Kachhwaha.

Under Bharmal, the kingdom heavily aligned with the Mughals and he even married his daughter to Akbar. His son and grandson Bhagwant Das and Raja Man Singh were leading generals in Akbar's army and helped him in expanding the empire. Mirza Raja Jai Singh served under Shah Jahan and became a distinguished general. He fell out of Aurangzeb's favor when he was suspected of helping Shivaji escape from Mughal captivity in 1664. Sawai Jai Singh II became the ruler during the decline of the Mughal empire. He successfully rebelled against the Mughals in 1708 to regain his confiscated kingdom. After Jai Singh's death, the kingdom was drained of its resources during the civil war amongst his sons Ishwari and Madho Singh and the Marathas caused the Kingdom to fall into economic downturn.

It became a princely state under the East India Company rule after signing a treaty creating a subsidiary alliance with the Company in 1818, after the Third Anglo-Maratha War. It acceded to independent India in 1947 and was integrated into India by 1949. Upon integration,  the ruler was granted a pension (privy purse), certain privileges, and the use of the title Maharaja of Jaipur by the Government of India. However, the pension, privileges, and the use of the title were ended in 1971 by the 26th Amendment to the Constitution of India.

History

Origins 
The Kachwaha Rajputs claim descent from Kusha, son of the legendary Rama. Their ancestors allegedly migrated from Rama's kingdom of Kosala and established a new dynasty at Gwalior. After 31 generations, they moved to Rajputana and created a kingdom at Dhundhar.

Some historians associate Dulha Rao, the founder of the Jaipur Kachhwaha lineage, with the Kachchhapaghata dynasty that ruled over a part of Rajasthan and Madhya Pradesh in 10th century. It is possible that Dulha Rao descended from the Narwar branch of this dynasty. VS Bhargava associates Dulha with the successor of the last ruler of the Nawar branch, Tejaskaran. 

According to Jadunath Sarkar, Dulha's grandfather Ishwar Singh, the ruler of Narwar, renounced his throne and divided his estate among his younger brother and his nephew and travelled North of Chambal to live a life of religious recluse. After his death, his son Sodo crowned himself king again but soon died and was succeeded by his son Dulha who built support for his cause and soon received the fort of Dausa in dowry from the Chauhans of Lalsot. M. L. Sharma suggests that Dulha was placed in Dausa particularly to help fight the Bargujar chief who partly controlled the city.
Dulha Rao soon defeated the Meenas of Khoh and Manchi and later completed the conquest of Dhundhar by defeating the Bargurjar after which he was granted the captured land by the Chauhans. Dulha chose Khoh as his capital after Dausa.

Early rulers 

Dulha's successor, Kakil captured Amber from the Meenas and laid foundation of the future capital. The early rulers of Dhundar may have been feudatories of the Chahamanas of Shakambhari as its ruler Pajjun is referred as such in the Prithviraj Raso. Pajjun's successor Malesi  consolidated power in Dhundar by marrying into neighboring regions and also may have defeated the ruler of Mandu in the battle of Rutroli. Udaikaran ascended to the throne in 1367. He defeated the Khyam-Khanis to secure Dhundar as a Kachhwaha territory.

Under Rai Chandrasen in the 15th century, Kachhwahas were defeated by Kumbha of Mewar and he extracted tribute from Dhundar. Chandrasen was succeeded by Prithviraj Singh in 1503. Rima Hooja explains that the relation between Prithviraj and Sanga wasn't exactly a feudal-chief relation in modern understanding but closer to a junior ally. Prithviraj joined the Rajput Confederacy of 1527 led by Rana Sanga against Babur and fought in the Battle of Khanwa in which they were defeated. He, alongside with Maldeo Rathore, rescued Rana Sanga from the battlefield of Khanwa in 1527. Rana Sanga was poisoned by his nobles two months after the battle for insisting to continue fighting a lost war and Prithviraj died in November of the same year. V. S. Bhatnagar suggests that the death of Prithviraj may have been similar to Sanga's as his multiple nobles readily joined the Mughals soon after his death.

He was succeeded by his preferred son Puranmal, son of his favorite wife. Eventually, Humayun assisted Puranmal achieve stability. Puranmal could only rule for 7 years. According to conflicting sources, he either died fighting for or against Humayu's brother Hindal Mirza or was overthrown by his brother Bhim Singh. Bhim Singh was quickly succeeded by his son Ratan Singh in 1537. During his reign, Sher Shah Suri invaded Rajputana and established control over Mewar and Marwar. Ratan Singh also accepted Suri suzerainty. During his reign, his uncle and son of Prithviraj, Sanga captured a part of territory and called it Sanganer where he was succeeded by his brother Bharmal. Ratan Singh was incompetent and was not able to control the actions of his uncles. Ratan Singh was poisoned by his half-brother Askaran but he was quickly deposed by the nobles who placed Bharmal on the throne.

As a Mughal ally under Bharmal and Bhagwant Das 
Bharmal had to initially deal with Sur general Haji Khan Pathan but was able to make peace with him. Soon, governor of Mewat, Mirza Muhammad Sharif-ud-din Hussain, who supported the cause of the son of Puranmal, Suja attacked Amber in 1558. Bharmal surrendered to Sharif-ud-din and also had to give up his son and nephews as hostages.

Feeling insecure after Sharif-ud-din's treaty, Bharmal, through his brother Rupsi, arranged a meeting with Mughal Emperor Akbar at Sanganer where they met in 1562. Here, Bharmal offered his daughter Jodha Bai's hand in marriage. The marriage took place in the same year in Sambhar. Bharmal's sons Bhagwant Das and Jagannath along with his grandson Man Singh were inducted into the Imperial court. The Kachhwaha princes in the Mughal court proved very vital because of their administrative and military skills and the Kachhwahas rose in prominence. Jodha Bai, now named Mariam-uz-Zamani also gained prestige in the Mughal court both during the reign of her husband and that of her son as Empress and Queen mother respectively. Bharmal died in 1574 and was succeeded by his son Raja Bhagwant Das, a trusted ally of Akbar.

Bhagwant Das was an exceptional military general and he accompanied Akbar throughout his expansion of the Mughal Empire across Rajasthan, Gujarat, Kashmir and the Punjab. In order to strengthen the ties with Mughals, he married his daughter Manbhavati Bai to Akbar's son Prince Salim. Bhagwant Das headed the Kashmir expedition of Akbar where in 1586, he defeated Yousuf Shah Chak and captured Kashmir. Das was appointed the subedar of Punjab in 1583 where he died in 1589.

Raja Man Singh

Initial campaigns under Akbar 
Bhagwant was succeeded by his son Man Singh I who was an instrumental part of the Mughal Army and diplomacy. He took part in Akbar's conquest of Chittor in 1568 and Ranthambhore in 1569. He was the part of negotiations with Mewar which failed, resulting in the Battle of Haldighati.

Man Singh was also given the command of the Mughal forces in Haldighati where he fought against Pratap Singh on 18 June 1576. In the ensuing battle, Man Singh was able to force Pratap to retreat and killed several of his commanders. Pratap had to retreat back to the hills of Gogunda and the battle was won by the Mughals.

Campaigns in Kabul, Bihar, Orissa and Bengal 
In 1580, the Islamic orthodoxy of the Mughal empire, upset with Akbar's liberal policies, declared Akbar's step brother Mirza Muhammad Hakim as the emperor instead. Man Singh was deputed in the North-Western section of the Mughal Empire under his father. Man Singh defeated Shadman Khan at Neelab in December 1580.Soon, Hakim himself marched to Punjab and laid siege to Lahore but later retreated. Man Singh followed and defeated him in 1581. Eventually, Hakim swore allegiance to Akbar once again and he was reappointed the Governor of Kabul. Hakim held this position till 1585 when he died. 

Soon after Hakim's death, the Yusufzai tribe of Afghanistan rebelled against the Mughals and launched attacks against Mughals stationed in the region. One of the attacks ended up killing Raja Birbal with 8000 Mughal troops. Man Singh along with Raja Todar Mal were sent to defeat the Yusufzai's in 1586. By 1587, Man Singh's service in Kabul was over and he was deployed in the Subah of Bihar.

In Bihar, Man Singh first defeated several rebellious rulers like Puranmal followed by the Raja of Khadagpur and the Raja of Gaya and Sabhupuri in 1590.
Next, Man Singh was sent to capture Orissa which was under the control of Afghan chief Qutlu Khan and his son Nasir Khan. After Qutlu Khan's death, Nasir Khan who decided to make peace with Man Singh and accepted Mughal supremacy. Man Singh acquired the Jagannath temple at Puri. In 1591, after the death of Isa Khan, the Afghan chiefs rebelled again and Man Singh invaded again and beat them conclusively.

Man Singh was soon transferred to Bengal in 1594 where he first shifted his capital to Rajmahal from Tandah. He subdued ruler of Dacca and Cooch Bihar. While in Bengal, Man Singh's eldest son, Jagat Singh died due to excessive drinking, after which he returned to Amber temporarily but soon had to return to deal with a rebellious Usman Khan whom he defeated in 1601 in Sherpur followed by defeating Kedar Rai in Dacca.. By 1604, Bengal was again completely under Mughal control.

After Akbar's death 
Towards the end of 1604, Akbar fell ill. Man Singh planned on placing his grandson Prince Khusrau on throne instead of his rebellious son Salim. He made several attempts like transferring Salim to Bengal, lobbying in the court, and trying to muster support but nothing worked. Eventually, disappointed, he left for Bengal and Akbar died in 1605 and was succeeded by Salim as Emperor Jahangir. Jahangir treated Man Singh well and also included him in the Deccan frontier. But after 1605, Man Singh couldn't lead any glorious ventures and died in Elichpur in 1614 and was succeeded by his only surviving son Bhau Singh overlooking a grandson Maha Singh.

Man Singh was a great builder and built several forts and temples across India. He built the Govind Dev Ji Temple in Brindavan and renovated the Sarovar Ghat in Varanasi and built several temples there.

Bhau Singh was sent on a campaign against Malik Ambar but failed because Ambar's army was much more efficient. He died in 1621 and had no heirs, so he was succeeded by Maha Singh's son Jai Singh.

Mirza Raja Jai Singh 
After ascending to the throne of Amber at the age of 11, his first task was to defend against the rebellious Prince Khurram. Khurram looted Amber in 1623 but was defeated by Jai in 1624. After Jahangir's death in 1627, instead of joining Noor Jahan's son Shahryar, Jai supported Khurram who went on to become Shah Jahan. Soon, Jai Singh would become one of the most decorated generals of the Mughal Imperial army and received many decorations from Shah Jahan.

Facilitation under Shah Jahan 
Jai was first deputed to suppress a rebellion in Mahaban and then sent to fight Nazr Muhammad in Kabul. Jai was also tasked with dealing with the rebellious Khan-i-Jahan in Ghatpur. In 1631, he was part of the campaign against Bijapur Sultanate. He commanded his forces and distinguished himself during the Siege of Parenda and Daulatabad in 1635. After the command of the army was handed to Prince Aurangzeb in 1636, Jai Singh also won the fort of Nagpur and Devgarh in 1637.

In 1639, because of his display of immense valor, he was bestowed upon, the unique title of Mirza Raja by Shah Jahan. In 1654, he was sent to Chittor to confront Maharana Raj Singh for violating the 1616 treaty by carrying out repairs to the Chittorgarh.

The war of succession of Shah Jahan 
When the war of succession of 1657 broke out, Jai Singh was deputed to convince Prince Shuja to end his rebellion but failed. He later defeated Shuja in Bahadurpur in 1658. Later, Shuja surrendered to Dara Shikoh and was given the charge of Bengal. Raja Jaswant Singh of Marwar was defeated by Prince Aurangzeb and Murad in 1658 and they marched towards Agra. Jai Singh couldn't reach Agra in time and Dara Shikoh was defeated in the Battle of Samugarh. Soon, Jai Singh presented himself in front of the new emperor Aurangzeb and was tasked with capturing Dara Shikoh. He defeated Shikoh in the Battle of Deorai in 1659. Dara sought refuge under Malik Jeevan but he was betrayed and turned in with Jai Singh who brought him back to Agra.

Struggle with Aurangzeb over Shivaji 
In 1664, Jai Singh was sent to command the campaign against Shivaji. In 1665, Jai Singh laid siege to Purandar fort and was able to get Shivaji to sign the Treaty of Purandar according to which Shivaji would surrender 23 forts, send his son Sambhaji to Mughal court and enter Mughal service. Jai wanted to utilize Shivaji's forces against Bijapur and wanted Shivaji to make peace with Aurangzeb. Jai Singh was able to convince Aurangzeb to meet Shivaji and vice-versa, after which he took Shivaji to Agra to meet the Mughal emperor. When Shivaji reached the Mughal court, he felt insulted and walked out of the hall without meeting Aurangzeb. While Jai tried to convince Aurangzeb to utilize Shivaji against Bijapur, several influential Mughal nobles wanted him killed. In a dilemma, Shivaji was housed with a Mughal noble.

On August 18, 1665, Shivaji made a dramatic escape from Agra and both Jai Singh and his son Ram Singh fell out of Aurangzeb's favor. Jai Singh made several bad attempts at battle in the next one month and spent a lot of his personal resources trying to make his dream Bijapur invasion happen  but failed. He was recalled to Agra and he died in 1667 in Burhanpur.

His successor Ram Singh was pardoned and was sent to fight Ahom force. Ram Singh was eventually defeated in the Battle of Saraighat. Ram Singh grew sick of war and finally, in 1676 he was allowed to leave and return to his province. He was later posted in Kohat where he died in 1688. His grandson Bishan Singh was tasked with controlling the Jat revolt at Mathura in which he succeeded. Around this time, Aurangzeb grew hostile towards Bishan and ordered him to fight in the Deccan, which Bishan declined and was instead transferred to Afghanistan and his son Jai was ordered to fight instead. Bishan Singh died in 1700 and was succeeded by his son Sawai Jai Singh.

Sawai Jai Singh II 

Bishan Singh was succeeded by his son Jai Singh II also known as Sawai Jai Singh. During his rule, the new capital city of Jaipur was founded in 1727.

As the new ruler of Dhundar, he was sent to the Deccan with Prince Bidar Bakht. Jai's forces demonstrated talent by defeating the Marathas at Khelna, Khandesh, Malwa and Burhanpur. Through these victories, Jai Singh II rebuilt the lost trust of Aurangzeb for the Kachhwaha family. He was confered with the title Sawai by Aurangzeb. In 1705, he was appointed the Naib Subedar of Malwa which helped increase his power.

The war of succession of Aurangzeb 
In 1707, Emperor Aurangzeb died and a war of succession began. Initially, Muhammad Azam Shah was able to capture the throne. Jai Singh supported Azam Shah and his son Bidar Bakht but then Azam Shah was eventually defeated and killed at the Battle of Jajau in the same year. Prince Muazzam crowned himself as Bahadur Shah I and he was hostile against Jai Singh. This hostility resulted in Bahadur Shah replacing Jai Singh with Bijai Singh, his younger brother, loyal to the Mughal emperor.

The Rajput rebellion of 1708 
In 1708, Bahadur Shah invaded Marwar and captured the entire state. This encouraged the major Rajput kingdoms, the Mewar, Marwar and Dhundar to form an alliance to fight against Bahadur Shah. Raja Ajit Singh of Marwar, Rana Amar Singh II of Mewar and Jai Singh II together left the Mughal camp in rebellion. To establish Matrimonial alliance, Jai married Chandra Kanwar, the daughter of Amar Singh II and Suraj Kanwar, the daughter of Ajit Singh. The three rulers marched together towards Jodhpur and took its control and by October 1708, Amber had also been taken over and Jai Singh restored as the Raja. The same year, the alliance marched against the Mughals at Sambhar and captured it which was then jointly ruled. Eventually, in 1710, Bahadur Shah decided to make peace with the Rajputs and accepted Ajit and Jai Singh as the rulers of their lands. 

Bijai Singh was executed in 1729 for conspiring to overthrow Jai Singh.

Return to influence 
After Bahadur Shah's death in 1712 and Jahandar Shah's overthrowing in 1713 and subsequent crowning of Emperor Farukhsiyar, Jai Singh regained his stature in the Mughal court and became an influential entity but he could never become as paramount as the Sayyid Brothers in the Mughal court. Jai Singh was appointed as the Subedar of Malwa in 1713 just in time to face and repel Maratha incursions in 1715. He was trusted with the task of dealing with the Jat chief Churaman who was besieged at Thun. He used his influence over the Sayyid brothers to negotiate a peace deal. In 1719, Farrukhsiyar was murdered by Sayyid brothers and Ajit Singh and was replaced by Rafi-ud-Darjat and Rafi-ud-Daulah in quick successions and eventually settled for Roshan Akhtar who became Emperor Muhammad Shah. Till 1720, Muhammad Shah got rid of the Sayyid brothers and Ajit Singh fell out of this favor, making Jai Singh even more powerful.

In 1722, Jai Singh was recalled to deal with Churaman. Jai Singh again laid siege to the fort of Thun and by 1722, Churaman committed suicide, his nephew Badan Singh accepted Mughal dominance and his son Mokham sought refuge in Mewar. By this time, Sawai Jai Singh II had become a very influential person in India and he was looked upon by all major leaders including the Peshwa, Nizam and other fellow Rajputs. It is also believed that Jai Singh had enough influence on Ajit Singh's son Abhay Singh that in 1724, he instigated him to murder and take over as the Raja of Marwar which he did with the help of his brother Bakht Singh. Jai Singh was again stationed at Malwa in 1729 to repel Maratha raids but this time, the Maratha force under Malhar Rao Holkar and Ranoji Scindia was much more powerful and Jai Singh II was defeated at the Battle of Mandsaur in 1732 after which he had to pay Chauth from 28 parganas.

In 1734, Jai Singh tried to put forward a pact at Hurda for mutual cooperation against the Marathas but nothing came out of it and it was never enforced. Marathas raided Rajputana, this time striking close to Jaipur, eventually obtaining even larger amounts of tribute in the form of chauth. In 1736, Jai Singh met Peshwa Baji Rao I at Bhambhola where he tried to convince him to sustain Muhammad Shah rule as a nominal head and take over the administration  which appealed to the Peshwa but this was made unrealistic after Nader Shah's sack of Delhi in 1740.

In 1740, Jai Singh ousted Rao Budh Singh from Bundi and crowned Dalel Singh and placed Zorawar Singh in Bikaner and made Abhay Singh make peace with Bikaner. In 1741, Jai Singh fought Bakht Singh of Marwar in the Battle of Gangwana and suffered immense losses in the war. He never recovered from this battle and died 2 years later.

Astronomy, Science and Mathematics 
Sawai Jai Singh II was a great patron of Science, Mathematics, Scholarship, Art, Architecture and Literature. Well acquainted with Indian and Greek mathematics, Jai Singh was aware of contemporary developments in Europe in the field of mathematics. He also made contacts with the Portuguese king Emmanuel in 1727 comparing Portuguese astronomical observations with Indian and pointing out that Indian versions were better. He made several instruments to make astronomical observations including small brass instruments to 24-meter stone structures and observatories called Jantar Mantar. Two Jatar-Mantars still exist in usable state, one in Delhi, one in Jaipur.

In 1727, He planned and founded a new capital city called Jaipur. He examined Indian traditions of architecture under the supervision of a Bengali Brahmin called Vidyadhar Bhattacharya. The city had streets and lanes that intersect each other at right angles and havelis, temples, gardens, civic buildings were built at pre-planned places. Much of this was completed by 1733.

Sawai Jai Singh II passed away on September 21, 1743.

Civil War between Ishwari and Madho Singh 

His eldest son Ishvari Singh ascended to the throne due to the right of primogeniture and was supported by the Mughals and the Marathas. His position was disputed by his younger brother Madho Singh who claimed that his grandfather Rana Amar Singh II was promised in 1708 that the son through his daughter Chandra Kanwar would inherit the throne regardless of primogeniture rules. Madho Singh's cousin Rana Jagat Singh II immediately presented his support for Madho. The Maharana invited Kota’s Rao Durjansal and Umaid Singh of Bundi against Ishwari Singh. Both sides were about to face each other in battle but the war was prevented by Madho accepting Toda and Tonk along with some other parganas in grant.

The Maharana tried to lay siege to Jaipur but Ishwari Singh was able to get the Marathas to repel them. Eventually the Maharana was able to win the support of Malhar Rao Holkar and the forces met at Battle of Rajmahal in 1747 in which Madho Singh and his commanders had to retreat and were forced to pay tribute. Madho Singh tried again at the Battle of Bagru and was able to defeat Ishwari Singh but Ishwari remained on throne. Malhar Rao again laid siege to Jaipur in 1750, and Ishwari did not have enough force to defend so he consumed poison and killed himself leaving his throne for his brother Madho Singh.

Decline at hands of the Marathas 

After the civil war, Sawai Madho Singh was unable to repay the Marathas who frequently raided Jaipur from 1751 to 1759 and extracted ransom money, hurting the financial situation of Dhundhar. Raghunath Rao, Jankoji Rao Scindia and Malhar Rao Holkar invaded Jaipur several times, extracting lakhs of rupees in Chauth. Madho tried to invade Kota in 1761 but was defeated at the battle of Bhatwara. He tried to invade Bharatpur in 1767 but died in 1768 succeeded by his 5 year-old son Sawai Prithvi Singh who died because of falling from a horse in 1778 and was succeeded by his 13 year-old brother Sawai Pratap Singh. During this time, a senior noble of the Kachhwaha court, Pratap Singh Naruka  supported the rival claim of Prithvi Singh's son Man Singh and also invited Mahadaji Shinde to attack Jaipur. Marwar and Dhundar joined hands to face Mahadji at the Battle of Tunga in 1784 in which they had a win with small margins. In 1787, Mahadji Scindia and his force led by Generak Benoît de Boigne inflicted a heavy defeat on Jaipur in the Battle of Lalsot followed by a decisive defeat at the Battle of Patan in 1790. Throughout the 1790s, the Marathas extracted a lot of tribute from Dhundar worsening its financial situation. 

In 1799, Maratha commander Vaman Rao and an Irish Commander George Thomas who faced Pratap Singh at the Battle of Fatehpur in 1799. The Rao-Thomas alliance faced difficulty and were advised by the commander of Daulat Rao Sindhia, General Pierre Perron to retreat. Next year, Daulat Rao and General Perron defeated Pratap Singh at the Battle of Malpura. Sawai Pratap Singh died in 1803 leaving the throne to his son Sawai Jagat Singh.

Jagat Singh had been chosen as the fiancé of Krishna Kumari, the princess of Mewar after Bhim Singh of Marwar died in 1803 but Bhim's successor Man Singh of Marwar insisted that he must be the husband of Krishna Kumari. Soon, Jagat Singh, with the support of Pindari chief Amir Khan faced Man Singh at the battle of Gingoli. Marwar was defeated and Mehrangarh was besieged. Shortly afterwards, Amir Khan changed sides and allied with Man Singh. Krishna Kumari was eventually poisoned to put an end to the conflict. From 1807 to 1813, Amir Khan, backed by Yashwantrao Holkar raided Jaipur and extracted lakhs of rupees in chauth.

Towards the end of the 18th century, the Jats of Bharatpur and the Kachwaha chief of Alwar declared themselves independent from Jaipur and each annexed the eastern portion of Jaipur's territory. Nevertheless, enough wealth remained in Jaipur for the patronage of fine temples/palaces, continuity of its courtly traditions and the well-being of its citizens and merchant communities. The Jaipur rulers also made large scale punya-udik (charitable) grants to many Charans, Brahmans, Bhats (bards) and various Vaishnavite institutions.

Under the British Empire

Initial treaty 
A treaty was initially made by Maharaja Sawai Jagat Singh and the British under Governor General Marquis Wellesley in 1803, however the treaty was dissolved shortly afterwards by Wellesley's successor, Lord Cornwallis. In this event, Jaipur's Ambassador to Lord Lake observed that "This was the first time, since the English government was established in India, that it had been known to make its faith subservient to its convenience". In 1818, after the Third Anglo-Maratha War Jagat Singh desided to enter the subsidiary alliance with the British under which it was decided that 
Jaipur state agreed to give rupees eight lakhs as khiraj annually to the East India Company.
It would receive British protection and support.

Sawai Jagat Singh died 9 months after the signing of this treaty and left no heir. A faction of nobles in the court tried to place Mohan Singh, the son of the chief of Narwar on the throne but the widow of Jagat Singh declared that she was pregnant with the heir which was later confirmed. Sawai Jai Singh III was born in 1819 and was recognized as the Raja.

Instability 
The Financial condition of Jaipur worsened after Prime Minister Nazir Mohan Ram was ousted by the queen mother and eventually the troops of Jaipur started demanding pay and British had to militarily intervene. Most of Jai Singh III's reign was spent in court rivalries and instability of the state and in 1833, Queen-mother died and in 1835 Jai III also died. Soon roomers spread that Prime Minister Jhutaram had poisoned Jai Singh III to ensure more power for themselves. The British had to intervene again. An Infant Sawai Ram Singh II succeeded Jai III. Another misunderstanding started a rumor that the British Political agent had assassinated the Infant Raja which led to an uprising. Later, after a judicial review, several Jaipur ministers were hanged.

Reforms under the British and Ram Singh II 

Upon the regent’s death in 1838, the kingdom came under direct supervision of successive British political agents.  Various laws were framed in this duration. In 1839, regular revenue-related civil courts, or Adalat Diwani, as well as criminal courts, or Adalat Faujdari, were established for Jaipur state. In 1840, the state was divided into fresh administrative zones, districts, and parganas. Other administrative, judicial and social reforms were introduced. Infanticide was outlawed, and slavery abolished. In addition, certain other administrative institutions were streamlined.  It was also during the minority of Sawai Ram Singh II that the state of Jaipur banned the practice of sati by law in 1846. 

When Sawai Ran Singh II turned major, he introduced more reforms. During the 1854-55 period, four new departments of police, medical, education, and survey & settlement were set-up, each under a separate administrator. The state’s administrative units were re-organised into five districts or sub-areas, each placed under a nazim. 

Ram Singh placed due importance on education too. Maharaja’s College was established in 1844. By 1867 its first batch had taken the matriculation examination from Calcutta University, by 1873 it had been raised to the ‘Intermediate’ level, and by 1875 its original forty students had grown to eight hundred. The Maharaja established a Sanskrit College too, and in 1861 a school for Rajput boys. In 1866-67 an art and craft centre, ‘Maharaja’s School of Art and Crafts’ and established at Jaipur city in 1857. 

The state later became well-governed and prosperous. During the Indian rebellion of 1857, when the British invoked the treaty to request assistance in the suppression of rebellious sepoys, the Maharaja opted to preserve his treaty, and thus sent in troops to help to subdue the uprisings in the area around Gurgaon.

In 1869, Ram Singh II signed a treaty with the British Government to lease the Sambhar Lake for 2.75 Lakh rupees annually. This treaty was further expanded in 1879 according to which any indigenous production of salt in Jaipur would be suppressed in exchange for tax free import and export of salt. 

Sawai Ram Singh II died in 1881 without an heir and was succeeded by the Thakur of Isarda, Qayam Singh who ascended to the throne as Sawai Madho Singh II.

Jaipur state had a revenue of Rs.65,00,000 in 1901, making it the wealthiest princely state in Rajputana.

Jaipur's last princely ruler signed the accession to the Indian Union on 7 April 1949.

Padmanabh Singh is the current head of the erstwhile royal family that once ruled Jaipur. Estimates of the royal family's wealth vary, but Singh is estimated to control a fortune of between $697 million and $2.8 billion.

List of rulers

The rulers are Rajputs of the Kachwaha clan. The list of rulers and titular rulers are as follows:

Rulers 
 27 Dec 966 – 15 Dec 1006 Sorha Deva (d. 1006)
 15 Dec 1006 – 28 Nov 1036 'Dulha Rao' (d. 1036)
 28 Nov 1036 – 20 Apr 1039 Kakil (d. 1039)
 21 Apr 1039 – 28 Oct 1053 Hanu (d. 1053)
 28 Oct 1053 – 21 Mar 1070 Janddeo (d. 1070)
 22 Mar 1070 – 20 May 1094 Pajjun Rai (d. 1094)
 20 May 1094 – 15 Feb 1146 Malayasi (d. 1146)
 15 Feb 1146 – 25 Jul 1179 Vijaldeo (d. 1179)
 25 Jul 1179 – 16 Dec 1216 Rajdeo (d. 1216)
 16 Dec 1216 – 18 Oct 1276 Kilhan (d. 1276)
 18 Oct 1276 – 23 Jan 1317 Kuntal (d. 1317)
 23 Jan 1317 – 6 Nov 1366 Jonsi (d. 1366)
 6 Nov 1366 – 11 Feb 1388 Udaikarn (d. 1388)
 11 Feb 1388 – 16 Aug 1428 Narsingh (d. 1428)
 16 Aug 1428 – 20 Sep 1439 Banbir (d. 1439)
 20 Sep 1439 – 10 Dec 1467 Udharn (d. 1467)
 10 Dec 1467 – 17 Jan 1503 Chandrasen (d. 1503)
 17 Jan 1503 – 4 Nov 1527 Prithviraj Singh I (d. 1527)
 4 Nov 1527 – 19 Jan 1534 Puranmal (d. 1534)
 19 Jan 1534 – 22 Jul 1537 Bhim Singh (d. 1537)
 22 Jul 1537 – 15 May 1548 Ratan Singh (d. 1548)
 15 May 1548 – 1 June 1548 Askaran (d. 1599)
 1 June 1548 – 27 Jan 1574 Bharmal (d. 1574)
 27 Jan 1574 – 4 Dec 1589 Bhagwant Das (b. 1527 – d. 1589)
 4 Dec 1589 – 6 Jul 1614 Man Singh (b. 1550 – d. 1614)
 6 Jul 1614 – 13 Dec 1621 Bhau Singh (d. 1621)
 13 Dec 1621 – 28 Aug 1667 Jai Singh I (b. 1611 – d. 1667)
 10 Sep 1667 – 30 Apr 1688:  Ram Singh I (b. 1640 – d. 1688)
 30 Apr 1688 – 19 Dec 1699:  Bishan Singh (b. 1672 – d. 1699)
 19 Dec 1699 – 21 Sep 1743:  Jai Singh II (b. 1688 – d. 1743)
 1743 – 12 Dec 1750:  Ishwari Singh (b. 1721 – d. 1750)
 1750 – 5 Mar 1768:  Madho Singh I (b. 1728 – d. 1768)
 1768 – 13 Apr 1778:  Prithvi Singh II (b.  1762 – d. 1778)
 1778 – 1803:  Pratap Singh (b. 1764 – d. 1803)
 1803 – 21 Nov 1818: Jagat Singh II (b. ... – d. 1818)
 22 Dec 1818 – 25 Apr 1819: Mohan Singh (regent) (b.  1809 – d. ...)
 25 Apr 1819 –  6 Feb 1835: Jai Singh III (b. 1819 – d. 1835)
 Feb 1835 – 18 Sep 1880: Ram Singh II (b. 1835 – d. 1880)
 18 Sep 1880 –  7 Sep 1922: Madho Singh II (b. 1861 – d. 1922)
 7 Sep 1922 – 15 Aug 1947 (subsidiary):  Sawai Man Singh II (b. 1912 – d. 1970)
 15 Aug 1947 – 7 Apr 1949 (independent): Sawai Man Singh II (b. 1912 – d. 1970)
He merged Jaipur State in Union of India in 1949 CE.

Titular rulers
The titular  rulers of the Jaipur State includes:

 7 Apr 1949 – 24 Jun 1970: Sawai Man Singh II
 24 Jun 1970 – 28 Dec 1971: Sawai Bhawani Singh
 June 2011 - Present:  Sawai Padmanabh Singh

Other family members

 Diya Kumari

Jaipur Residency

The Jaipur Residency was established in 1821. It included the states of Jaipur, Kishangarh and Lawa. The latter had belonged to the Haraoti-Tonk Agency until 1867.

See also
 History of Jaipur
 Jaipur
 Jaipur State Railway

Notes

References

Bibliography 

History of Jaipur
Princely states of Rajasthan
Rajputs
Rajputana Agency
1128 establishments in Asia
1949 disestablishments in India
12th-century establishments in India
Rajput princely states